is one of the eleven wards in the city of Kyoto, in Kyoto Prefecture, Japan. Its name means "South Ward." It was established in 1955 when it was separated from Shimogyo-ku.  As of April, 2016 the ward has an estimated population of 100,781 people. The Kamo River and the Katsura River flow through the district. It is home to several historical places and temples.

Minami-ku is roughly bound on the east by the Kamo River, on the west by the Katsura River (although it extends over the Katsura River in some places), on the north by Hachijō Street and the JR Kyoto line (leading into Kyoto station), and on the south by the Meishin Expressway (although it extends over the expressway in some places).

The southern portion of Kyoto city (including Minami-ku) is sometimes referred to as Rakunan. This area is the only side of Kyoto not lined with mountains, a feature that historically made Rakunan important as a gateway into Kyoto.

Minami-ku is more working-class than some other Kyoto districts, and includes a large population of Korean nationals known as Zainichi Koreans. Instead of restaurants and clubs, portions of the land near the Kamo River are lined with factories and industrial buildings. Residential areas include both standard houses and apartments, and occasional government-subsidized housing projects.

The area around Kujo Street from around Toji station to the Kamo River is known as Higashi (east) Kujo. This area is particularly working-class, and home to a relatively large number of Korean nationals and other working class members of Japanese society. As such, it has been called "Kyoto's only international town".

Minami-ku has few notable areas of tourist interest compared to other parts of Kyoto. A notable exception is the To-ji Temple.

The Minami-ku ward office is located on Route 1, near its intersection with Kujō Street. The Kyoto City Disaster Prevention Center is also in Minami-ku, near the intersection of Route 1 and Jujō Street.

To the east of Minami-ku is Higashiyama-ku, and to the southeast is Fushimi-ku.

Demographics

Temples and Landmarks

Tō-ji a famous Buddhist temple with strong associations to the Buddhist priest Kūkai
Former site of the Rashomon Gate, the old Southern entrance to the city
Rokusonnō Shrine, one of the Three Genji Shrines

Economy
The following companies have their headquarters in Minami:
  the home office of international company Nintendo is near the aforementioned intersection.
 Horiba, a global manufacturer of precision instruments for measurement and analysis
 Nidec, a global electric motor and electronic and optical components company
 Wacoal, a manufacturer of women's lingerie and underwear
 GS Yuasa, a manufacturer of batteries

Education

 Kyoto Computer Gakuin
The community previously had a North Korean school, Kyoto Korean No. 1 Elementary School (京都朝鮮第一初級学校).

References

External links
 The Minami-ku official website

Further reading
 Durston, Diane.  "Old Kyoto: A Guide to Traditional Shops, Restaurants, and Inns".  Pg 203.  Kodansha International Ltd.  1986 and 2005.  .  
 Rowthorn, Chris. "Lonely Planet Kyoto". Lonely Planet Publications. July 1, 2012. 
  Minami-ku Town Guide. September 2006]

Wards of Kyoto
Zainichi Korean culture